The Los Angeles White Sox were a Negro league baseball team in the West Coast Negro Baseball League, based in Los Angeles, California, in 1946.

References

Negro league baseball teams
White Sox
Defunct baseball teams in California
Baseball teams established in 1946
Baseball teams disestablished in 1946